Firmex is a cloud-based Virtual data room service provider headquartered in Toronto, Ontario, Canada.

Virtual data rooms facilitate secure document sharing across corporate firewalls. They are used for highly confidential or complex transactions seen with M&A,  Corporate Finance, and Procurement, as well as Regulatory compliance and Governance processes.

History
In 2004, Davies Ward Phillips & Vineberg, a Toronto-based international business law firm, contracted Version 5.1 to develop the Davies Deal Room, online virtual data room software designed to facilitate legal transactions and M&A transactions. This project was commercialized by Version 5.1 in 2006 as Firmex Inc.

From 2007 to 2008, Firmex raised a total of $4.4 million from angel investors. By the end of 2009, the company had licensed 500 customers running over 2,500 transactions a year.

In 2011, Firmex reached a customer milestone of 1,000. During 2012, the company's workforce grew by 25 percent.

In 2014, Firmex was named No. 13 in the Deloitte Technology Fast 50.

In 2015 Firmex was a Deloitte Fast 500 winner.

In 2016, Novacap, a Montreal-based Private Equity Fund, acquired a majority interest in Firmex. Firmex's customers started over 12000 virtual data rooms.

In 2018, Firmex expanded its European operations, opening an office in London, England.

In 2019, VERTU Capital, a Toronto-based Private Equity Fund, BDC Capital and Firmex management acquired Firmex.

In 2019, Firmex was awarded the 2019 Stevie Awards for Customer Service.

In 2020, Firmex was awarded as one of Canada's Most Admired Corporate Cultures.

References

External links
Firmex website

File hosting
File sharing services
Cloud applications
Technology companies of Canada
Companies based in Toronto